The 117th Space Battalion is a battalion of the Colorado National Guard constituted in 2006. Nicknamed the "Space Cowboys", by 2018 the unit was one of the most deployed in the National Guard of the United States.

On 20 October 2007 the provisional 193rd Space Battalion became a permanent-status unit, the 117th Space Battalion. The 117th Space Battalion is not part of 1st Space Brigade and is controlled by the National Guard. However, it has a Training, Readiness, Oversight (TRO) relationship with 1st Space Brigade.

See also
 United States Space Command

References

Colorado National Guard
Battalions of the United States Army
Space units and formations of the United States Army
Military units and formations established in 2007